Mount Mecheva is the broad ice-covered peak with precipitous rocky north, east and southwest slopes that peaks at 1367 m in the Bigla Ridge on Foyn Coast, Antarctic Peninsula.  It surmounts Beaglehole Glacier to the southwest, Sleipnir Glacier to the northwest and Cabinet Inlet to the northeast.

The feature is named after Rumyana Mecheva, biologist at St. Kliment Ohridski Base in 1999/2000 and subsequent seasons.

Location
Mount Mecheva is located in the Bigla Ridge, 13 km southwest of Balder Point, 13.7 km northwest of Spur Point, 14.9 km north of Varad Point and 6.87 km northeast of Chuypetlovo Knoll.  British mapping in 1974 and 1976.

Maps
 British Antarctic Territory: Graham Land.  Scale 1:250000 topographic map.  BAS 250 Series, Sheet SQ 19-20.  London, 1974.
 British Antarctic Territory.  Scale 1:200000 topographic map. DOS 610 Series, Sheet W 66 64.  Directorate of Overseas Surveys, Tolworth, UK, 1976.
 Antarctic Digital Database (ADD). Scale 1:250000 topographic map of Antarctica. Scientific Committee on Antarctic Research (SCAR). Since 1993, regularly upgraded and updated.

Notes

References
 Mount Mecheva. SCAR Composite Antarctic Gazetteer.
 Bulgarian Antarctic Gazetteer. Antarctic Place-names Commission. (details in Bulgarian, basic data in English)

External links
 Mount Mecheva. Copernix satellite image

Mecheva
Foyn Coast
Bulgaria and the Antarctic